Dejon Allen (born May 5, 1994) is a professional gridiron football offensive tackle for the Toronto Argonauts of the Canadian Football League (CFL) also seen sometime in the National football league (NFL). He played college football at Univeraity of Hawaii

College career

Hawai'i Warriors  
2017 (Senior): Named to the all-Mountain West first team…earned all-conference recognition for the third straight year...also named team’s Coach June Jones Offensive MVP for the second straight year…started 11 of 12 games at left tackle…scored the highest offensive grade (92.8 percent) on the line…did not allow a single sack in drop-back pass situations...helped UH to its best rushing average (168.2) in 22 years… missed his only game of the season vs. Colorado State game (Sept. 30), ending a streak of 42 straight starts dating back to his redshirt freshman season…finished with 49 starts in 50 games played during his four-year career.

2016 (Junior): Named to the all-Mountain West second team...named the Coach June Jones Offensive MVP...started all 14 games at left tackle after making an offseason switch from guard...graded out 90 percent or above in all 14 games...did not give up a single sack all season during drop-back pass plays.

Professional career

Chicago Bears 
Allen signed with the Chicago Bears as an undrafted free agent on May 1, 2018. He spent the season with the Chicago Bears before being released on May 3, 2019.

Green Bay Packers 
Allen signed with the Green Bay Packers on August 29, 2019. He was released during roster cuts on September 1, 2019.

St. Louis Battlehawks 
Allen was selected by the St. Louis BattleHawks in phase two of the 2020 XFL Draft.

New York Guardians 
Allen was traded to the New York Guardians on January 17, 2020, for David Rivers and Brian Wallace.

Toronto Argonauts 
Allen signed with the Toronto Argonauts on December 28, 2020.

References

External links 
 
 Toronto Argonauts profile
 Hawaii Rainbow Warriors profile

1994 births
Living people
Sportspeople from Compton, California
Players of American football from Los Angeles
American football offensive linemen
Hawaii Rainbow Warriors football players
Chicago Bears players
Green Bay Packers players
St. Louis BattleHawks players
New York Guardians players
Toronto Argonauts players
Players of Canadian football from Los Angeles